The Olifants River, Lepelle, iBhalule or Obalule is a river in South Africa and Mozambique, a tributary of the Limpopo River. It falls into the Drainage Area B of the Drainage basins of South Africa.
The historical area of the Pedi people, Sekhukhuneland, is located between the Olifants River and one of its largest tributaries, the Steelpoort River.

Course
The Olifants River has its origin between Breyten and Bethal, Mpumalanga Province. It flows north towards Limpopo Province through Witbank Dam and then the Loskop Dam and is forced east by the Transvaal Drakensberg, cutting through at the Abel Erasmus Pass and then flowing east further across the Lowveld to join with the Letaba River. It crosses into Gaza Province, Mozambique, after cutting through the Lebombo Mountains by way of the Olifants Gorge, becoming the Rio dos Elefantes, and finally joining the Limpopo River after 40 km before it enters the Indian Ocean at Xai-Xai north of Maputo.

Water quality
Overgrazing in sections of its middle course result in the river carrying away eroded soil after heavy rains. The Olifants river has become one of the most heavily polluted rivers in South Africa, not by human or industrial waste, but by thriving green algae. A 2013 study in the Kruger Park found that the river was mesotrophic, meaning that nutrient levels were fairly low,  though a slight increase in nitrates could initiate eutrophication. Very high sulphate levels were attributed to coal mining and industry in the upper catchment.

Tributaries
The Olifants River's largest tributaries are the Letaba River and the Steelpoort River known as Tubatse River. Other tributaries are the Tongwane, Blyde, Moses, Spekboom, Timbavati, Nkumpi, Ga-Selati, Klaserie, Makhutswi, Mohlapitse River, Lepellane River, Mohwetse River and Ngwaritsi River. Some tributaries, notably the Klein Olifants River (origin near Hendrina, joins the Olifants River downstream of the Middelburg Dam), the Elands, Wilge and the Bronkhorstspruit, rise in the Highveld grasslands. The Shingwedzi River flows close to the northeastern side of the Massingir Dam reservoir and joins the left bank of the Olifants about 12 km downstream from the dam wall.

Dams
Thirty large dams in the Olifants River Catchment include the following:

South Africa
Witbank Dam
Rhenosterkop Dam, on the Elands River
Rust de Winter Dam
Blyderivierpoort Dam
Loskop Dam
Middelburg Dam, on the Klein Olifants River
Ohrigstad Dam
De Hoop Dam
Flag Boshielo Dam
Phalaborwa Barrage

Mozambique
Massingir Dam

See also
 List of rivers in South Africa
 Water Management Areas

References

External links

The Olifants River Basin, South Africa
Massingir Dam Rehabilitation
South African Geographical Names

 
Rivers of Mpumalanga
Rivers of Limpopo
Tributaries of the Limpopo River